Miss America 1973, the 46th Miss America pageant, was held at the Boardwalk Hall in Atlantic City, New Jersey, on September 9, 1972 and broadcast on NBC.

The winner was Terry Meeuwsen, the first woman representing Wisconsin to take the crown. She would later become co-host of television's The 700 Club.

Among the finalists was Cindy Lee Sikes, entered as Miss Kansas, who became the actress Cynthia Sikes and co-star for three seasons in the 1980s on the NBC drama St. Elsewhere.

Results

Placements

Order of announcements

Top 10

Awards

Preliminary awards

Other awards

Judges
 Vivianne Della Chiesa
 Dr. Edward A. Shellhous
 Art Fleming
 Trudy Haynes
 Dr. Wellington B. Gray
 Eileen Farrell
 Robert F. Lewine
 Mary Healy
 Peter Lind Hayes

Contestants

External links
 Miss America official website

1973
1972 in the United States
1973 beauty pageants
1972 in New Jersey
September 1972 events in the United States
Events in Atlantic City, New Jersey